The 2017 Tempe Challenger was a professional tennis tournament played on hard courts. It was the inaugural edition of the tournament which was part of the 2017 ATP Challenger Tour. It took place in Tempe, United States between 13 and 19 February 2017.

Singles main-draw entrants

Seeds

 1 Rankings are as of February 6, 2017.

Other entrants
The following players received wildcards into the singles main draw:
  Roberto Cid Subervi
  Michael Geerts
  Benjamin Hannestad
  Bradley Klahn

The following player received entry as an alternate:
  Salvatore Caruso

The following players received entry from the qualifying draw:
  Luke Bambridge
  Daniel Elahi Galán
  Nicolás Jarry
  Brayden Schnur

The following player received entry as a lucky loser:
  José Hernández-Fernández

Champions

Singles

 Tennys Sandgren def.  Nikola Milojević 4–6, 6–0, 6–3.

Doubles

 Walter Trusendi /  Matteo Viola def.  Marcelo Arévalo /  José Hernández-Fernández 5–7, 6–2, [12–10].

External links
 Official website

Tempe Challenger
2017 in sports in Arizona
Tennis tournaments in Arizona
2017 in American tennis